Yeh Vaada Raha may refer to:

 Yeh Vaada Raha (film), a 1982 Hindi film
 Yeh Vaada Raha (TV series), a Hindi television show that aired on Zee TV

See also 
 Yeh Wada Raha, a 2003 Pakistani Urdu language film